Vedat İnceefe (born 1 April 1974 in Bandırma, Balıkesir) is a retired Turkish football player.

He played for Soma Sotesspor (1992–1994), Karabükspor (1994–1996), Galatasaray (1996–2000 and 2000–2003), İstanbulspor (2000), Vestel Manisaspor (2003–2006), Bursaspor (2006) and now Karabükspor.

He played for Turkey national football team and was a participant at the 1996 UEFA European Championship.

Honours 
 Galatasaray
 UEFA Super Cup: 2000

References

1974 births
Living people
People from Bandırma
Turkish footballers
Turkey international footballers
Association football defenders
Galatasaray S.K. footballers
İstanbulspor footballers
Bursaspor footballers
Kardemir Karabükspor footballers
Manisaspor footballers
UEFA Euro 1996 players
Süper Lig players